March to the Sea may refer to:

A march or journey
 A rough, but commonly used, translation for the Greek term katabasis
 Salt March or Gandhi's march to the sea, 1930
 Sherman's March to the Sea during the American Civil War
 Race to the Sea during World War I

Art, entertainment, and media
 March to the Sea (novel), a novel by John Ringo and David Weber
 "March to the Sea", a song by Pelican from the album The Fire in Our Throats Will Beckon the Thaw
 "March to the Sea", a song by Baroness from the album Yellow & Green